Nikolai Ilyich Podvoisky (February 16 [O.S. February 4], 1880 – July 28, 1948) was a Russian Bolshevik revolutionary, Soviet statesman and the first People's Commissar of Military and Naval Affairs of the Russian SFSR.

He played a large role in the Russian Revolution of 1917 and wrote many articles for the Soviet newspaper Krasnaya Gazeta. He also wrote a history of the Bolshevik Revolution, which describes progress of the Russian Revolution.

Early life 

Nikolai Podvoisky was born in Kunochevsk village in the Chernihiv (formerly Chernigov) province, in to a  Ukrainian family, one of seven children of a former teacher who had become a priest. In 1901, he was expelled from Chernigov Seminary for political activities. In that same year, he enrolled in the Law Faculty in Yaroslavl, and joined the Russian Social Democratic Labour Party (RSDLP), using the alias 'Mironovich'. After the RSDLP split in 1903, he became a leading figure in the Bolshevik organisation in Yaroslavl. He was arrested in 1904 and again in 1905, for helping organise a strike by the city's railway workers, but soon released on both occasions. Injured during a demonstration, he sought treatment in Germany and Switzerland. He returned to Russia in 1906, and worked illegally as Bolshevik organiser in St. Petersburg, Kostroma, and Baku. In 1913, he settled near St. Petersburg to organise the smuggling of Bolshevik literature into Russia. He was arrested in November 1916, but released during the February Revolution.

Revolution and civil war 
In March 1917, Podvoisky was co-opted onto the Petrograd (St. Petersburg) Bolshevik committee, and was appointed head of the Bolshevik Military Organisation. This organisation played a critical role during the disturbances that threatened to bring down Russia's Provisional Government in July 1917. 
Leon Trotsky acknowledged that "under Podvoisky, who easily mastered the functions of command, an impromptu general staff was formed...In order to protect the demonstration from attack, armoured cars were placed at the bridges leading to the capital and at the central crossings of the main streets." After the demonstrations were suppressed, Podvoisky — according to Trotsky — veered from being "too impetuous" to becoming "far more cautious", but despite his scepticism played a leading part in the military operation that overthrew the Provisional Government 
in November 1917, including planning the final act that brought down the government, the assault on the Winter Palace.

Later career 
Immediately following the Bolshevik Revolution in November 1917, Podvoisky was one of a troika, with Nikolai Krylenko and Pavel Dybenko appointed People's Commissar for Defence, before they were replaced by Trotsky, in March 1918. He was a founder of the Red Army, but was not an important military commander. He rapidly lost influence during the civil war, part of which he spent in Ukraine. At the tenth party congress of the Russian Communist Party, in March 1920, he proposed that the army should be demobilised and replaced by a localised militia system, a proposal that received no notable support.

In 1920, Podvoisky was appointed Chairman of the Supreme Council of Physical Culture, which ran the system of compulsory physical training of youths prior to their being called up for military service. In July 1921, during the third Comintern congress, in Moscow, he founded the Red Sport International (Sportintern), whose task, according to him, was to "convert sport and gymnastics into a weapon of the class revolutionary struggle, concentrate attention of workers and peasants on sport and gymnastics as one of the best instruments, method and weapons for their class organisation and struggle."

He lost the chairmanship of the Supreme Council of Physical Culture when he was replaced by Nikolai Semashko in 1923, and by 1926 he had lost effective control of Sportintern to the head of the Communist Youth International, Vissarion Lominadze. 
In 1924-30, Podvoisky was a member of the Central Control Commission, and a reliable supporter of Joseph Stalin against Trotsky and other oppositionists.

From 1935 he was retired and was a personal pensioner. He was engaged in propaganda, literary and journalistic activities for the remainder of his life.

In October 1941, after he was not accepted for military service because of his age, Podvoisky volunteered to lead the digging of trenches near Moscow.

On July 28, 1948, Nikolai Podvoisky died of a severe heart attack in Moscow. He was buried with military honors in Moscow at the Novodevichy cemetery.

Advising Eisenstein 

In 1927, Podvoisky was the leading consultant on the film October, directed by Sergei Eisenstein, to mark the tenth anniversary of the October revolution. He helped Eisenstein to find suitable locations in Leningrad, and told him: "You know how stubborn I am, you'd better not argue with me! Better listen to me, and then later don't do it. But make a note of everything I say so that I have the impression I'm being listened to."

On Nudity 
Podvoisky was also the foremost Soviet exponent of nudity. He wrote:

He continued writing on sport and as a party historian until he retired on health grounds in 1935.

Personality 

By the time Trotsky wrote his history of the Bolshevik revolution, Podvoisky had joined his enemies, yet Trotsky wrote about him more respectfully than about many of the others who went on to join Stalin's faction.

Family 
Podvoisky married Nina Didrikil (1882–1953), an Old Bolshevik, who worked at the Lenin Institute, preparing Lenin's manuscript for publication. One of her sisters married the Chekist, Mikhail Kedrov; the other was mother of another chekist, Artur Artuzov. They had five daughters, one of whom, Nina, married Andrei Sverdlov, son of the high ranking Bolshevik Yakov Sverdlov, and a son, Lev, who married the daughter of the Bolshevik Solomon Lozovsky.

References

1880 births
1948 deaths
Communist Party of the Soviet Union members
Old Bolsheviks
People from Chernihiv Oblast
People from Nezhinsky Uyezd
People of the Russian Civil War
Recipients of the Order of the Red Banner
Russian Constituent Assembly members
Russian Marxist historians
Russian revolutionaries
Russian Social Democratic Labour Party members
Soviet defence ministers of Ukraine
Soviet historians
Soviet Marxist historians
Soviet Ministers of Defence